"I Don't Love You" (stylized as "i don't lovE you") is a song recorded by Canadian country music artist Lindsay Ell for her fifth studio album, Heart Theory (2020). The song was written by Adam Hambrick, Melissa Fuller, and Neil Medley. It was released by Stoney Creek Records on November 8, 2019 as the album's lead single and officially impacted American country radio on December 9, 2019.

Content
"I Don't Love You" was written in June 2017, inspired by a hook contributed by co-writer Adam Hambrick. The song follows a compound metre melody in 6/8 time with a "rambling, free-flow" vocal delivery that producer Dann Huff likened to a hip hop rhythm. Lyrically, the song relies on references to restaurants and memories of an ex-lover to capture the back-and-forths in the aftermath of a relationship. When the song was selected for recording by Ell, she and Huff decided to adjust the song's musical foundation from piano to guitar to better suit her musical sensibilities; Ell recorded blues-inspired guitar fills to complement the studio musicians.

Critical reception
Lauren Jo Black of Country Now wrote that the song is "painstakingly beautiful" and "quite possibly Ell’s best vocal work to date." Billy Dukes of Taste of Country praised Ell's delivery of the song, writing that her convincing emotion despite not writing the lyrics "speaks to her much-improved ability to tell a great, universal country story."

Commercial performance
"I Don't Love You" was the most-added song at American country radio the week of its release. It has since peaked at number 48 on the Billboard Country Airplay chart. "I Don't Love You" has also peaked at number 6 on the Billboard Canada Country airplay chart and at number 99 on the Canadian Hot 100, her second career entry on the latter.

Charts

Release history

References

2019 songs
2019 singles
Lindsay Ell songs
BBR Music Group singles
Song recordings produced by Dann Huff
Songs written by Adam Hambrick